Penicillium nilense is a species of fungus in the genus Penicillium.

References

nilense
Fungi described in 1980